The Limacinidae are a family of small sea snails, pteropods, pelagic marine gastropod mollusks in the clade Thecosomata (sea butterflies).

Genera
Genera within the family Limacinidae include:
 Altaspiratella Korobkov, 1966 - synonym: Plotophysops Curry, 1982
 † A. elongatoidea (Aldrich, 1887) - type species of the genus Altaspiratella
 † A. bearnensis (Curry, 1982)
 † A. multispira (Curry, 1982)
 Currylimacina Janssen, 2003
 C. cossmanni (Curry, 1981) - type species of the genus
 Heliconoides d’Orbigny, 1835 - Heliconoides may be split into various separate genera.
 † H. auriformis (Curry, 1982)
 † H. daguini Cahuzac & Janssen, 2010
 † H. hospes (Rolle, 1861)
 (recent) H. inflatus (d’Orbigny, 1836) - type species of the genus = Limacina inflata (d'Orbigny, 1836)
 † H. linneensis Janssen, 2008
 † H. mercinensis (Watelet & Lefèvre, 1885)
 † H. merlei Cahuzac & Janssen, 2010
 † H. mermuysi Cahuzac & Janssen, 2010
 † H. nemoris (Curry, 1965)
 † H. paula (Curry, 1982)
 † H. pyrenaica Cahuzac & Janssen, 2010
 † H. sondaari Janssen, 2007
 † H. tertiaria (Tate, 1887)
 Limacina Bosc, 1817 - type genus of the family Limacinidae
 Striolimacina Janssen, 1999
 † S. andaensis Janssen, 2007
 † S. imitans (Gabb, 1873) - type species of the genus Striolimacina
 Skaptotion Curry, 1965
 Thielea 
 (recent) T. procera Strebel, 1908 = helicoides (Jeffreys, 1877) - Thielea procera is the type species of the genus.
 new genus?
 'Limacina' adornata Hodgkinson, 1992
Genera brought into synonymy
 Embolus Jeffreys, 1869: synonym of Heliconoides d'Orbigny, 1835
 Heterofusus Fleming, 1823; synonym of Limacina Bosc, 1817
 Lornia Marwick, 1926; synonym of Limacina Bosc, 1817
 Munthea van der Spoel, 1967; synonym of Limacina Bosc, 1817
 † Plotophysops Curry, 1982; synonym of † Altaspiratella Korobkov, 1966
 Polloneria Sulliotti, 1888: synonym of Heliconoides d'Orbigny, 1835
 Protomedea O. G. Costa, 1861; synonym of Heliconoides d'Orbigny, 1835
 Scaea Philippi, 1844: synonym of Limacina Bosc, 1817
 Spiratella Blainville, 1817: synonym of Limacina Bosc, 1817
 Spirialis Eydoux & Souleyet, 1840: synonym of Limacina Bosc, 1817
 Thilea; synonym of Thielea Strebel, 1908

References

Further reading 
 Powell A. W. B., New Zealand Mollusca, William Collins Publishers Ltd, Auckland, New Zealand 1979 

 
Taxa named by John Edward Gray